A list of films produced by the Tollywood (Bengali language film industry) based in Kolkata in the year 1954.

A-Z of films

References

External links

1954
Lists of 1954 films by country or language
Films, Bengali